The Luxembourg Marathon (official: ING Night Marathon Luxembourg, sponsored by ING) is an annual marathon by night in Luxembourg which was held for the first time in 2006 as Europe Marathon.

Past winners
Key:

References

Profile at marathoninfo

External links
Official website

Marathons in Europe
Recurring sporting events established in 2006
International sports competitions hosted by Luxembourg
Athletics in Luxembourg
Athletics competitions in Luxembourg
2006 establishments in Luxembourg
Spring (season) events in Luxembourg